

The Miller Lil' Rascal was a two-seat sporting biplane built by high school students in Claxton, Evans County, Georgia, USA, in the late 1970s.  Construction began in November 1975 by a group of 15 students at Claxton High School under the direction of B. G. Tippins. Of conventional biplane configuration, it accommodated pilot and passenger side-by-side in an open cockpit. The wings were of dacron-covered wood, and the fuselage was of dacron-covered welded steel tube construction. It had fixed tailwheel undercarriage with spatted mainwheels.

Designer Merle Miller originally intended to market plans for the aircraft through his firm Aeroneering Inc, but abandoned the idea before any were sold. The single prototype (registration N11LR) was the only example produced.

Specifications

See also

References
 
 Jane's All the World's Aircraft (1979-80), 503.

1970s United States sport aircraft
Homebuilt aircraft
Biplanes
Aircraft first flown in 1979